Aynur Aydın (born 15 December 1985) is a Turkish German singer and songwriter. After having some musical experiences in "Sürpriz" band in Germany, she moved to Turkey and released her debut album, 12 Çeşit La La - 12 Ways to La La. She won a Golden Butterfly Award for "Best New Artist" category. In 2016, she released her second album Emanet Beden featuring the hits "Günah Sevap" and "Bi Dakika".

Life
Aynur Aydın was born in Munich, south Germany, to Turkish parents, on 15 December 1985. She started singing at the age of 10 and gained her first experiences in the child and youth theatres. In order to improve her singing skills, she started to make stage shows at the age of 18. In 2000, she joined a band named Sürpriz and they recorded their first album in Istanbul. After Sürpriz disbanded, Aydın joined the group Tagtraeumer. They attempted to represent Germany at the Eurovision Song Contest 2003 with their song "Mükemmel Dünya İçin".

Her first album was recorded in the Cosmos Studio. The songs were combined in the album 12 Çeşit La La - 12 Ways to La La. The Turkish lyrics were written by Aşkın Tuna, Fettah Can, Günay Çoban, Süleyman Yüksel, Nihan Özen and by her own. The first music video was shot for the "Yenildim Daima" and "DNA" which is the English version of the same song. The second music video was shot for the song "Measure Up" and its Turkish version "Yanı Başıma". Then, she took part in Erdem Kınay's Project and sang the song "İşporta". In July 2012, the music video was shot in Belgium and directed by Şenol Korkmaz. In April 2016, her second studio album Emanet Beden was released and the songs "Günah Sevap" and "Bi Dakika" rose to number 3 on Turkish music charts. In December 2017, she released the single "Bana Aşk Ver", featuring Turaç Berkay Özer. Since 2017, she has continued her career by releasing the singles "Salla" (2018), "Düşüne Düşüne" (2019) and "Gel Güzelim" (2019).

Discography

Albums
 12 Çeşit La La - 12 Ways to La La (2011)
 Emanet Beden (2016)

EPs
 Acoustics (2021)

Singles
 "Life Goes On" (2013)
 "Günah Sevap" (2015)
 "Bi Dakika" (2016)
 "Bana Aşk Ver" (2017)
 "Salla" (2018)
 "Düşüne Düşüne" (2019)
 "Gel Güzelim" (2019)
 "Yağdır" (feat. Damla Yıldız) (2020)
 "Sahiden" (feat. Bünyas Herek) (2020)
 "Sor Gel" (2021)
 "Bilmece" (2022)
 "Siyah" (feat. Turaç Berkay) (2022)

Music videos
 "Yenildim Daima" / "DNA" (2011)
 "Yanı Başıma" / "Measure Up" (2012) 
 "İşporta" (featuring Erdem Kınay) (2012)
 "Ayrılıklar Mevsimi" / "Better" (2012)
 "Nolur Gitme" / "Stay" (2013)
 "Life Goes On" (2013)
 "Günah Sevap" (2015)
 "Bi Dakika" (2016)
 "Damla Damla" (2016)
 "Anlatma Bana" (2017)
 "Bana Aşk Ver" (2017)
 "Salla" (2018)
 "Düşüne Düşüne" (2019)
 "Gel Güzelim" (2019)
 "Yağdır" (featuring Damla Yıldız) (2020)
 "Diğer Yarın" (2020)
 "Sahiden" (featuring Bünyas Herek) (2020)
 "Sor Gel" (2021)
 "Bilmece" (2022)
 "Siyah" (featuring Turaç Berkay) (2022)

Awards and nominations

References

External links 
 
 

1985 births
Living people
Musicians from Munich
21st-century Turkish singers
21st-century Turkish women singers
Turkish pop singers
Turkish dance musicians
German people of Turkish descent
Turkish lyricists